The 2010 Nobel Prize in Literature was awarded the Peruvian writer Mario Vargas Llosa (born 1936) "for his cartography of structures of power and his trenchant images of the individual's resistance, revolt, and defeat." The prize was announced by the Swedish Academy on 7 October 2010. He is the first Nobel laureate in Literature from Peru and the fifth Latin American to become one after 1982 Colombian laureate Gabriel García Márquez and 1971 Chilean laureate Pablo Neruda.

Laureate

Mario Vargas Llosa was one of the leading writers in the Latin American boom. His extensive, rich authorship consists mostly of novels, but also of plays, essays, literary criticisms, and journalism. His major breakthroughs include La ciudad y los perros (lit. "The City and the Dogs"/trans. "The Time of the Hero", 1963), La casa verde ("The Green House", 1965), La guerra del fin del mundo ("The War of the End of the World", 1984), and the monumental Conversación en la catedral ("Conversation in the Cathedral", 1969). His works reflect his ardent love of storytelling. They are characterized by rich language and cover a range of genres—from autobiographical books and historical novels to erotic fiction and thrillers such as La tía Julia y el escribidor ("Aunt Julia and the Scriptwriter", 1982) and Travesuras de la niña mala ("The Bad Girl", 2007). He has also won literary prizes such as the 1967 Rómulo Gallegos Prize, 1986 Prince of Asturias Award, 1994 Miguel de Cervantes Prize, and the 1995 Jerusalem Prize.

Reactions

The Nobel Prize in Literature awarded to Mario Vargas Llosa was well received around the world. "The world recognizes the intelligence and the will of freedom and democracy by Vargas Llosa and it is an act of enormous justice" said Alan García, president of Peru. Spanish writer Javier Marías said "it is one of those prizes that never or almost never needs to be discussed." Novelist William Boyd paid tribute to "a great chroncicler of the highs and lows of our carnal and passionate adventures as human beings". 
The prize was also celebrated by Bernard Kouchner, foreign minister of France, Felipe Calderón, president of Mexico, and the King of Spain Juan Carlos, among others. 

Vargas Llosa himself said he was delighted but surprised: "For years I haven't thought about the Nobel prize at all. They didn't mention me in recent years so I didn't expect it. It's been a surprise, very nice, but a surprise. At first I thought it was a joke," he told RPP Noticias.

Nobel lecture
In his Nobel lecture Elogio de la lectura y la ficción, delivered at the Swedish Academy on 7 December 2010, Vargas Llosa paid tribute to the power of fiction and said he believed it was essential to a healthy society. "We would be worse than we are without the good books we have read, more conformist, not as restless, more submissive, and the critical spirit, the engine of progress, would not even exist," he argued. "Like writing, reading is a protest against the insufficiencies of life. When we look in fiction for what is missing in life, we are saying, with no need to say it or even to know it, that life as it is does not satisfy our thirst for the absolute – the foundation of the human condition – and should be better."

Award ceremony presentation speech
In his award ceremony speech on 10 December 2010 Per Wästberg, member of the Swedish Academy and chairman of the Nobel committee for literature, said of Vargas Llosa:

References

External links
Prize announcement nobelprize.org
Award ceremony speech nobelprize.org
Nobel lecture nobelprize.org
Nobel diploma nobelprize.org

2010
Mario Vargas Llosa